Gilberto Fernández (born 10 March 1933) is a Colombian former sports shooter. He competed in the 50 metre pistol event at the 1972 Summer Olympics.

References

External links
 

1933 births
Living people
Colombian male sport shooters
Olympic shooters of Colombia
Shooters at the 1972 Summer Olympics
Place of birth missing (living people)
20th-century Colombian people
21st-century Colombian people